Darija Jurak Schreiber (née Jurak; ; born 5 April 1984) is an inactive Croatian professional tennis player. Her career-high doubles ranking is world No. 9, achieved on 15 November 2021. Her best WTA ranking in singles of 188 she reached in April 2004.

World TeamTennis
Jurak has played six seasons with World TeamTennis and was part of the 2016 San Diego Aviators team which hoisted the King Cup after winning the WTT Championships. She debuted in 2013 with the Texas Wild returning in 2014. She played her next three seasons with the Aviators from 2015 to 2017. In 2019, Jurak joined the expansion Orlando Storm for their inaugural season. 

It was announced that she will rejoining the Storm during the 2020 season set to begin July 12.
Jurak paired with Jessica Pegula throughout the season in women's doubles, helping the Storm earn a No. 3 seed in the WTT Playoffs. The Storm ultimately fell to the Chicago Smash, in the semifinals.

Grand Slam doubles performance timeline

Significant finals

WTA 1000 finals

Doubles: 2 (1 title, 1 runner-up)

WTA career finals

Doubles: 22 (9 titles, 13 runner-ups)

WTA Challenger finals

Doubles: 1 (runner-up)

ITF Circuit finals

Singles: 15 (8–7)

Doubles: 64 (39–25)

References

External links
 
 

1984 births
Living people
Croatian female tennis players
Tennis players from Zagreb
Tennis players at the 2020 Summer Olympics